Monticello High School may refer to: 

Monticello High School (Arkansas), Monticello, Arkansas
Monticello High School (Florida), Monticello, Florida
Monticello High School (Georgia), Monticello, Georgia
Monticello High School (Illinois), Monticello, Illinois
Monticello High School (Iowa), Monticello, Iowa
Monticello High School (Louisiana), East Carroll Parish, Louisiana
Monticello High School (Minnesota), Monticello, Minnesota
Monticello High School (New York), Monticello, New York
Monticello High School (Utah), Monticello, Utah
Monticello High School (Virginia), Albemarle County, Virginia
Monticello High School (Wisconsin), Monticello, Wisconsin
The high school component of Monticello Independent Schools in Monticello, Kentucky, a K-12 facility that houses all grades under one roof